Immaculate Conception Parish - designated for Polish immigrants in Southington, Connecticut, United States. Founded on September 19, 1915. It is one of the Polish-American Roman Catholic parishes in New England in the Archdiocese of Hartford.

History 
In 1904 the Polish immigrants organized the Guardian Angel Society in an effort to found a Polish parish. In 1906, a committee of the society asked Bishop Michael Tierney for a Polish priest. None was then available. By 1910 Bishop John Joseph Nilan sent Fr. John Sullivan to serve the immigrants within St. Thomas Parish. A new Polish Catholic parish was officially approved in September 1915 by Bishop John Joseph Nilan. Property was secured as a future church site, along with a house to serve as a rectory. On September 19, 1915, Fr. Woroniecki celebrated the first parish Mass at a hall belonging to the Polish Falcons. On July 9, 1916, Bishop John Joseph Nilan dedicated the basement church of Immaculate Conception Parish. The completed church was finally dedicated on October 28, 1923.

References

Bibliography 
 
 The Official Catholic Directory in USA

External links 
 Immaculate Conception - Diocesan information 
 Immaculate Conception - ParishesOnline.com
 Archdiocese of Hartford

Roman Catholic parishes of Archdiocese of Hartford
Polish-American Roman Catholic parishes in Connecticut
Immaculate Conception Parish
Immaculate Conception Parish